Caudium is an open source web server.  It was originally created as a fork of the Roxen Challenger server.  The server is written in C and Pike, and Pike is also used to create extensions to the server.

Caudium is very different from the Apache.  The configuration process is different, the directory structure is different, and generally the languages used to program server extensions or dynamic pages are different, although both support PHP. According to the Caudium website, Caudium offers a different performance profile than Apache, because it doesn't fork external processes, making it better suited to cope with sudden spikes of traffic.

See also

 Comparison of web server software

References

External links

Free software programmed in C
Free web server software
Web server software for Linux